Rajinder Kumar Vij (born 15 July 1939) is an Indian sports shooter. He competed in the men's 25 metre rapid fire pistol event at the 1984 Summer Olympics.

References

External links
 

1939 births
Living people
Indian male sport shooters
Olympic shooters of India
Shooters at the 1984 Summer Olympics
Place of birth missing (living people)
Commonwealth Games medallists in shooting
Commonwealth Games bronze medallists for India
Shooters at the 1982 Commonwealth Games
20th-century Indian people
Medallists at the 1982 Commonwealth Games